Mustafa Agha Barbar El Korek (1767 – 28 April 1835) was an Ottoman Syrian statesman and military officer who was governor of the Ottoman province of Tripoli, ruling between 1800–08, 1810–20 and 1821-35.

Name
The middle word in his name, Agha, is actually a title derived from the Turkish word for "chief, master, or lord." It was a title for a civil or military officer in the Ottoman Empire, and was placed after the name of such military functionaries.

Biography
Barbar was originally a peasant from al-Qalamoun, in the Koura District. At the beginning of his career he was in the service of Emir Hasan Shihab (the brother of Emir Bashir Shihab II). By virtue of his acumen, bravery, skill and energy, according to historian Mikhail Mishaqa, Barbar attained high office and acquired standing among the viziers and subjects. It is said that he was the chief antagonist of Emir Bashir Shihab II around Abdullah Pasha al-Azm (Wali of Damascus).

Barbar was appointed governor of Tripoli by the Ottomans in 1798. In the early 19th century, he had extensive restoration work done on the Citadel of Tripoli (castle of Saint Gilles), resulting in its present state. Later on, he endowed large portions of his property in Tripoli to his wives, relatives and slaves (mamluks), shortly after his grip on power was challenged. He also endowed property in Tripoli for the building of a canal and two water fountains, in order to enhance his local image. His rule in Tripoli was challenged by Kunj Yusuf Pasha, Wali of Damascus, in 1808, but Barbar withstood the siege with support from Albanian mercenaries.

Between 1809 and 1813, Barbar, who hated the Alawites, attacked the Kalbiyya tribe from among them with "marked savagery." His principal enemy was the semi-autonomous Alawite sheikh of Safita, Saqr al-Mahfuz. In 1816, Barbar built the fortress of Iaal. That same year, soldiers serving him ravaged a number of Ismaili Shia villages in the Nusayriyya Mountains, which proved disastrous for the Ismailis. This included the final destruction of the Al-Kahf Castle.

Between 1820 and 1825, an Ottoman imperial decree went forth, ordering for Barbar's execution. He came to the Mount Lebanon Emirate, seeking asylum with Emir Bashir, who appointed a residence for him and his people in the village of Shwayfat (Aley District), until he could obtain a pardon through the offices of the governor of Egypt, Muhammad Ali (with whom Emir Bashir was allied). A friendship thus was formed between the former enemies. In October, 1833, Barbar was dismissed from office and arrested by the new Egyptian authorities. Muhammad Ali of Egypt was now in control, as opposed to the previous Ottomans. Barbar was arrested for his levying the ‘awayid, a tax levied to support the officeholders from his subjects, which was prohibited by the new Egyptian authorities.

Barbar died April 28, 1835, possibly due to a heart attack or similar affliction. He was buried at the Iaal fortress on April 29.

Some of his modern descendants now live in Tripoli and Iaal, Lebanon.

See also
Ottoman Syria

References

Further reading
 The Greek Orthodox waqf in Lebanon during the Ottoman period, Volume 113 of Beiruter Texte und Studien. By Souad Abou el-Rousse Slim. Published by Ergon Verlag, 2007. /
 The Royal Archives of Egypt and the disturbances in Palestine, 1834 Issue 11 of Oriental series, American University of Beirut Faculty of Arts and Sciences. Issue 11 of Publication of the Faculty of Arts and Sciences: Oriental series. By Asad Rustum. Printed at the American Press, 1938.
 Page 41, A modern history of Syria, including Lebanon and Palestine, by Abdul Latif Tibawi. Illustrated edition. Published by Macmillan, 1969.
 Les européens vus par les libanais à l'époque ottomane, Volume 74 of Beiruter Texte und Studien. By Bernard Heyberger, Carsten-Michael Walbiner. Published by Ergon Verlag, 2002. /
 Page 189, The American journal of Semitic languages and literatures, Volume 41. By the University of Chicago. Dept. of Semitic Languages and Literatures. Published by the University of Chicago Press, 1925.
 Page 303, Politics and change in a traditional society; Lebanon, 1711-1845, by Iliya F. Harik. Published by the Princeton University Press, 1968
 Pages 100 and 121-122; The Ottomans in Syria: a history of justice and oppression Tauris Academic Studies. By Dick Douwes, Published by I.B. Tauris, 2000. Illustrated edition. /

18th-century people from the Ottoman Empire
19th-century people from the Ottoman Empire
Political people from the Ottoman Empire
Civil servants from the Ottoman Empire
1767 births
1835 deaths
Ottoman Sunni Muslims
Ottoman governors of Tripoli, Lebanon